Nelly Barkan (born 18 November 1973) is an Israeli former professional tennis player.

Barkan made her WTA main draw debut at the 1993 Citizen Cup in the doubles event partnering Olga Lugina.

ITF Circuit finals

Singles: 7 (5–2)

Doubles: 16 (10–6)

External links
 
 

1973 births
Living people
Jewish tennis players
Israeli female tennis players
Israeli Jews
Russian emigrants to Israel
Israeli people of Russian-Jewish descent